The Alético Cuernavaca, is a Mexican football club based in Cuernavaca. The club was founded in 2007, and currently plays in the Tercera División de México.

Players

Current squad

References

External links 

Association football clubs established in 2007
Football clubs in Morelos
2007 establishments in Mexico